Danville is an unincorporated community in Prince George's County, Maryland, United States. It is located within the Brandywine mailing address, and consists of only farms, with no businesses, and a very small housing development which began in 2009.

References

Unincorporated communities in Prince George's County, Maryland
Unincorporated communities in Maryland